Francisco 'Fran' Manuel Vélez Jiménez (born 23 June 1991) is a Spanish professional footballer who plays for Saudi club Al Fateh SC as a central defender or a right-back.

Club career

Gimnàstic
Born in Tarragona, Catalonia, Vélez began playing football for Club Esportiu La Floresta. In the 2009 winter he signed a contract with Gimnàstic de Tarragona, where he spent his last year as a junior.

On 10 April 2010, Vélez made his official Nàstic debut, starting against Albacete Balompié in a 1–1 away draw. He made three more appearances during the season in Segunda División, against Real Betis, Cádiz CF (where he was sent off) and UD Las Palmas. In the following campaign he represented CF Pobla de Mafumet, the farm team.

Vélez was loaned to UD Logroñés of Segunda División B in August 2011. He scored his only goal of the season against Real Sociedad B, contributing to a 3–1 home win.

On 14 July 2012, Vélez returned to Nàstic and its main squad. On 26 August he played his first game in his second stint, against Valencia CF Mestalla. He netted his first goal with the club on 7 October, opening the 2–0 home victory over CD Binissalem.

Almería
On 2 September 2013, Vélez signed with UD Almería, initially being assigned to the reserves also in the third division. He made his first-team debut on 14 January of the following year, starting as a right-back in a 0–2 home loss against Racing de Santander in the round of 16 of the Copa del Rey (1–3 on aggregate).

Vélez's maiden appearance in La Liga took place on 27 April 2014: he started and scored in a 2–1 win at RCD Espanyol, where he featured as a defensive midfielder before being replaced by Jonathan Zongo in the 71st minute. He played a further three matches with the main squad, only contributing four minutes in the last fixture, a 0–0 home draw with Athletic Bilbao.

On 7 June 2014, Vélez was definitely promoted to the first team. On 31 March 2015, he was ruled out for the remainder of the season after suffering a shoulder injury; the season also ended in relegation.

Vélez was regularly used during the following second-tier campaigns, and cut ties with the club on 28 June 2017.

Wisła Kraków
On 1 July 2017, Vélez signed with Polish club Wisła Kraków. He scored his only goal in the Ekstraklasa on 18 March 2018, helping to a 2–0 away victory over Legia Warsaw.

Aris
On 25 July 2018, after the player successfully passed his medicals, Aris Thessaloniki F.C. announced the signing of Vélez on a two-year contract. He scored his first goal for the team the following 24 February, heading home in a 1–1 draw at Super League Greece leaders PAOK FC.

Panathinaikos
Vélez agreed to join Panathinaikos F.C. on the 20th of February 2020, with the three-year deal being made effective on the 1st of July.

Personal life
Vélez's older brother, José Antonio, was also a footballer. Both played for Gimnàstic and Pobla.

Club statistics

Honours
Panathinaikos
Greek Cup: 2021–22

References

External links
Gimnàstic official profile 

1991 births
Living people
Sportspeople from Tarragona
Spanish footballers
Footballers from Catalonia
Association football defenders
La Liga players
Segunda División players
Segunda División B players
Tercera División players
Gimnàstic de Tarragona footballers
CF Pobla de Mafumet footballers
UD Logroñés players
UD Almería B players
UD Almería players
Ekstraklasa players
Wisła Kraków players
Super League Greece players
Aris Thessaloniki F.C. players
Panathinaikos F.C. players
Saudi Professional League players
Al-Fateh SC players
Spanish expatriate footballers
Expatriate footballers in Poland
Expatriate footballers in Greece
Expatriate footballers in Saudi Arabia
Spanish expatriate sportspeople in Poland
Spanish expatriate sportspeople in Greece
Spanish expatriate sportspeople in Saudi Arabia